Carl-Bertil Laurell (born 28 June 1919 in Uppsala, dead 18 September 2001 in Malmö) was a Swedish medical doctor and researcher.  Laurell was Professor of clinical chemistry at Lund University. He named the blood plasma protein transferrin, and discovered that an inherited lack of Alpha 1-antitrypsin could lead to emphysema.

In 1976, he was made a member of the Royal Swedish Academy of Sciences.

Laurell received the Edwin F. Ullman Award from the American Association for Clinical Chemistry on May 4 in 2001. 

He was married to Anna-Britta Laurell, Professor of immunology at Lund university, from 1946 until her death in 2000. The couple had six children. He died on 18 September 2001.

References

1919 births
2001 deaths
20th-century Swedish physicians
Academic staff of Lund University
Members of the Royal Swedish Academy of Sciences
Swedish biochemists